A half-birthday is a day approximately six months before or after the anniversary of a person's birth. It is sometimes marked by people whose birthday falls near major holidays, the celebration of which may overshadow celebration of the birthday. It may also be marked by students whose birthday does not occur during the regular school year; a half-birthday allows a celebration with friends at school, with half a cake.

Calculation 
There are two ways to calculate half-birthdays.

The easier but potentially less precise method is to take the number of the date of the birthday and advance the month by six: e.g. December 5 becomes June 5. Because not all months have the same number of days, this method does not always work – for example, six months after an August 30 birthday would be February 30, which is nonexistent in the Gregorian calendar. 

The more precise method is to add or subtract half the number of days in a year to the birth date.  In the case of a common year, this would be 182.5 days.  In leap years, the number of days would be 183. This method would lead to a March 1 or February 29 half-birthday for an August 31 birthday, depending on whether it's a leap year.

In the U.S., some tax-related penalties are related to half-years, such as a 10% penalty for making an early withdrawal from an IRA before age 59½. The federal government defines the half-year as being "six calendar months" after the anniversary of birth, regardless of what day of the month this produces. 

In many states in the U.S., the minimum age to obtain a learner permit occurs on a half-birthday, such as 14½ in Idaho, 14 years and eight months in Michigan, 15½ in California, and 15 years and nine months in Maryland. The same is true for receiving a restricted license when a minor in many states.

Popular culture 
At least three children's books have been written about half-birthdays:

Mentions in TV Series
 He brought gelato to every birthday. And every half-birthday. Which all three of these kids now think is an actual thing.

See also 
 Unbirthday

References

Birthdays